Lyudmyla Dmytrivna Yosypenko (born 24 September 1984) is a Ukrainian heptathlete.

Career
She came fourth at the 2012 London Olympics with a personal best of 6618 points. She was the winner of the Decastar competition that September.

In December 2012, the World Anti-Doping Agency notified Yosypenko that levels of haemoglobin in blood samples she had given differed from those described in her biological passport. She competed in the Ukrainian national championships in July 2013, but the Ukrainian Athletic Federation disqualified her the following day and imposed a four-year ban. Yosypenko protested, saying the changes in her haemoglobin levels were a result of medical treatments and that she would appeal the ban.  The IAAF confirmed the ban in September 2013. Her results from 25 August 2011 onwards were disqualified.

Achievements

References

1984 births
Living people
Doping cases in athletics
People from Yahotyn
Ukrainian heptathletes
Athletes (track and field) at the 2012 Summer Olympics
Olympic athletes of Ukraine
European Athletics Championships medalists
Ukrainian sportspeople in doping cases
Sportspeople from Kyiv Oblast
21st-century Ukrainian women